Cyphogastra is a genus of beetles in the family Buprestidae, containing the following species:
 Cyphogastra adonis Kerremans, 1911
 Cyphogastra amatina Kerremans, 1919
 Cyphogastra angulicollis Deyrolle, 1864
 Cyphogastra apicalis Kerremans, 1895
 Cyphogastra armata Théry, 1923
 Cyphogastra aterrima Kerremans, 1911
 Cyphogastra atramentaria Kerremans, 1919
 Cyphogastra augustini Théry, 1923
 Cyphogastra auripennis Saunders, 1867
 Cyphogastra bicolor Waterhouse, 1914
 Cyphogastra biimpressa Obenberger, 1922
 Cyphogastra bruyni Lansberge, 1880
 Cyphogastra calepyga (Thomson, 1857)
 Cyphogastra canaliculata Théry, 1908
 Cyphogastra carbonaria Théry, 1908
 Cyphogastra caudata Lansberge, 1880
 Cyphogastra celebensis Kerremans, 1910
 Cyphogastra chalcea Obenberger, 1922
 Cyphogastra collarti Descarpentires, 1956
 Cyphogastra coriacea Kerremans, 1910
 Cyphogastra cribrata Deyrolle, 1864
 Cyphogastra cristovallensis (Montrouzier, 1855)
 Cyphogastra cupreofossa Kerremans, 1910
 Cyphogastra cyaniceps Kerremans, 1910
 Cyphogastra cyanipes Kerremans, 1895
 Cyphogastra diabolica Obenberger, 1917
 Cyphogastra dissimilis Kerremans, 1895
 Cyphogastra emeraldina Kerremans, 1919
 Cyphogastra farinosa (Fabricius, 1775)
 Cyphogastra flavimana Lansberge, 1880
 Cyphogastra fossifrons Kerremans, 1895
 Cyphogastra foveicollis (Boisduval, 1835)
 Cyphogastra foveolata Deyrolle, 1864
 Cyphogastra froggatti Théry, 1947
 Cyphogastra fruhstorferi Nonfried, 1894
 Cyphogastra gestroi Kerremans, 1895
 Cyphogastra gigantica Obenberger, 1916
 Cyphogastra gloriosa Gestro, 1877
 Cyphogastra haidanae Théry, 1923
 Cyphogastra herculeana Obenberger, 1917
 Cyphogastra horni Obenberger, 1924
 Cyphogastra impressipennis Gestro, 1877
 Cyphogastra intrusa Deyrolle, 1864
 Cyphogastra javanica Saunders, 1871
 Cyphogastra kampeni Théry, 1937
 Cyphogastra kerremansi Obenberger, 1926
 Cyphogastra lansbergei Thomson, 1878
 Cyphogastra lateimpressa Kerremans, 1903
 Cyphogastra longicauda Théry, 1923
 Cyphogastra longueti Théry, 1926
 Cyphogastra loriae Théry, 1923
 Cyphogastra ludekingi Obenberger, 1922
 Cyphogastra malayensis Fisher, 1930
 Cyphogastra mniszechii Deyrolle, 1864
 Cyphogastra modesta Gestro, 1876
 Cyphogastra moluccana Kerremans, 1895
 Cyphogastra nigripennis Deyrolle, 1864
 Cyphogastra nigrita Kerremans, 1898
 Cyphogastra obiensis Théry, 1923
 Cyphogastra papuana Obenberger, 1917
 Cyphogastra pistor (Laporte & Gory, 1835)
 Cyphogastra punctatissima Kerremans, 1895
 Cyphogastra punctulata Kerremans, 1919
 Cyphogastra quadrivittata Carter, 1916
 Cyphogastra satrapa (Schönherr, 1817)
 Cyphogastra semipurpurea (Laporte & Gory, 1835)
 Cyphogastra similis Kerremans, 1919
 Cyphogastra simplex Kerremans, 1919
 Cyphogastra simplicissima Obenberger, 1926
 Cyphogastra stephensae Bellamy, 2004
 Cyphogastra strandi Obenberger, 1922
 Cyphogastra sulcipennis Gestro, 1877
 Cyphogastra taitina Kerremans, 1919
 Cyphogastra tayauti Guérin-Méneville, 1847
 Cyphogastra terminata Waterhouse, 1885
 Cyphogastra tevorensis Obenberger, 1922
 Cyphogastra tinianica Kurosawa, 1953
 Cyphogastra toxopeusi Obenberger, 1932
 Cyphogastra tuberculata Thomson, 1878
 Cyphogastra uxorismeae Holynski, 1994
 Cyphogastra ventricosa (Olivier, 1790)
 Cyphogastra viridis Kerremans, 1898
 Cyphogastra wallacei Deyrolle, 1864
 Cyphogastra waterhousei Théry, 1926
 Cyphogastra wollastoni Waterhouse in Arrow, et al., 1915
 Cyphogastra woodlarkiana (Montrouzier, 1855)

References

 
Buprestidae genera